Teuntje de Boer (born 31 May 1968) is a Dutch former cricketer. She played fourteen Women's One Day International matches for the Netherlands women's national cricket team. She was part of the Netherlands squad for the 2000 Women's Cricket World Cup.

References

External links
 

1968 births
Living people
Dutch women cricketers
Netherlands women One Day International cricketers
Sportspeople from Hengelo